Kim Sam-seok (born 9 December 1980) is a South Korean field hockey player who competed in the 2008 Summer Olympics.

References

External links
 

1980 births
Living people
South Korean male field hockey players
Olympic field hockey players of South Korea
Field hockey players at the 2008 Summer Olympics